Earlshall (73405) was an iron hulled Barque registered in St. John's, Dominion of Newfoundland.  It ran aground and wrecked on January 24, 1915 with no loss of life in Leeward Cove, 1.5 miles south of Motion Head, Petty Harbour-Maddox Cove, Newfoundland.

History 
The Earlshall was constructed by William Bruce Thompson at Dundee and launched on October 5, 1876.  It entered service with Robertson Brothers, Dundee.  In 1910 the vessel was purchased by Job Bros. & Co. Ltd., St. John's, Newfoundland & Labrador and entered service in the foreign fish cargo fleet which transported salted cod from Newfoundland to various ports along the east coast of North and South America.

Loss 
The Earlshall along with the vessels Clutha, Attila and Waterwitch were en route to St. John's Newfoundland from various ports in Brazil. On January 23, 1915 the vessels passed Cape Race all within one hour of each other. They met sea ice but kept to the south and skirted the main flow. By that evening the vessels had passed Ferryland Head and were practically together.

At 3am the following day a snow storm moved in, by that time the vessels were within speaking distance of each other with the Attila being closest to the Earlshall.  The wind grew stronger and the snowfall increased in intensity making it impossible to see the light house at Cape Spear.  The Earlshall moved away from the Attila. The Atilla and the other vessels continued on and safely reached port at St. John's later that day.

At about 4am, aboard the Earlshall, there was a tremendous crash as the vessel ran aground just south of Motion Head, Petty Harbour-Maddox Cove. Captain Coward was asleep at the time and the mate was on watch.  The seas were heavy and the vessel was pounded against the rocks and leaking badly.  The boats were launched with one being damaged and nearly sinking. The crew all managed to escape the stricken vessel and then rowed 8 miles south before making landfall. They walked 2 miles over land before finding shelter at a home in Goulds.  Contemporary reports state the Earlshall ran aground at practically the same location as the SS Regulus which would be in Leeward Cove, 1.5 miles south of Motion Head.

The captains of the other vessels were very upset that a tug had not been sent to meet them when it was known they had passed Cape Race the previous day.

References

External links 
 http://www.clydeships.co.uk/view.php?a1PageSize=50&ship_listPage=6&a1Order=Sorter_types&a1Dir=DESC&a1Page=560&ref=55890&vessel=EARLSHALL 
 https://wrecksite.eu/wreck.aspx?210207
 https://books.google.ca/books?id=dEGGmnsshywC&pg=PP128&dq=lloyd's+register+of+shipping+earlshall+1876&hl=en&sa=X&ved=0ahUKEwiix8-pjcnaAhVM4GMKHaGzDRAQ6AEIKTAA#v=onepage&q=lloyd's%20register%20of%20shipping%20earlshall%201876&f=false

Steamships of Canada
Shipwrecks of Canada
Maritime disasters
History of Newfoundland and Labrador
1876 ships
Shipwrecks of the Newfoundland and Labrador coast